The United Kingdom of Great Britain and Northern Ireland competed as Great Britain at the 1992 Winter Olympics in Albertville, France.

Competitors
The following is the list of number of competitors in the Games.

Alpine skiing

Men

Men's combined

Women

Women's combined

Biathlon

Men

Men's 4 x 7.5 km relay

 1 A penalty loop of 150 metres had to be skied per missed target.
 2 One minute added per missed target.

Bobsleigh

Cross-country skiing

Men

 1 Starting delay based on 10 km results. 
 C = Classical style, F = Freestyle

Curling

Curling was a demonstration sport at the 1992 Winter Olympics.

Figure skating

Men

Women

Pairs

Ice Dancing

Freestyle skiing

Men

Women

Luge

Men

Short track speed skating

Men

Women

Speed skating

Men

References

Official Olympic Reports
International Olympic Committee results database
 Olympic Winter Games 1992, full results by sports-reference.com

Nations at the 1992 Winter Olympics
1992
Winter Olympics
Winter sports in the United Kingdom